John McClelland (born 7 December 1955) is a former Northern Ireland international footballer who played for several teams during a 23-year career. He worked for Leeds United as part of the tour groups for Elland Road.

Club career
McClelland played for Portadown, Cardiff City, Bangor City (he was Welsh Cup runner up with both of these clubs), and Mansfield Town, before signing for Rangers for £90,000 in June 1981. There he won two Scottish League Cup winner's medals, and was twice a Scottish Cup runner up.

In November 1984 Watford paid £225,000 for his services. During his five years at Vicarage Road he was voted Watford Player of the Season twice. He later played for Leeds United, where he played 18 times as Leeds won the Football League First Division title in the 1991–92 season, the last season before the formation of the Premier League. During his time at Leeds he spent time on loan at old club Watford and Notts County.

In his later career he spent a season at St Johnstone as player manager, had a brief spell in the Irish League with Carrick Rangers, before playing for Arbroath, Wycombe Wanderers, Yeovil Town and Darlington. By the time he retired he had played in every country in the United Kingdom and in every tier of English football.

International career
At international level McClelland was also successful. He played for Northern Ireland at the 1982 and 1986 World Cups. He eventually won 53 caps, scoring one goal in a win over Turkey. He was also captain of Northern Ireland from after the 1986 World Cup until his retirement in 1990.

International goals
Scores and results list Northern Ireland's goal tally first.

Post football
He was player-manager at St Johnstone in the early 1990s. For a brief time after retirement McClelland could be found working at Leeds United taking tour groups around Elland Road. He is now a Postman in the Wakefield area.

Honours

Player
Leeds United
Football League First Division champions: 1991–92

Manager
St Johnstone
Forfarshire Cup : 1992-93

References

External links
John McClelland, Post War English & Scottish Football League A – Z Player's Database

1955 births
Living people
Association footballers from Belfast
Association footballers from Northern Ireland
Football managers from Northern Ireland
Northern Ireland international footballers
Cardiff City F.C. players
Bangor City F.C. players
Mansfield Town F.C. players
Rangers F.C. players
Watford F.C. players
Leeds United F.C. players
Notts County F.C. players
St Johnstone F.C. players
St Johnstone F.C. managers
Wycombe Wanderers F.C. players
Yeovil Town F.C. players
Darlington F.C. players
Portadown F.C. players
1982 FIFA World Cup players
1986 FIFA World Cup players
NIFL Premiership players
English Football League players
Scottish Football League players
Scottish Football League managers
Arbroath F.C. players
Leeds United F.C. non-playing staff
Association football defenders